Perth Museum may refer to:

Perth Museum and Art Gallery in Perth, Scotland
Perth City Hall, scheduled to reopen as Perth Museum in 2024
Matheson House (Perth), a historic house in Ontario, Canada that houses the Perth Museum

See also
Western Australian Museum in Perth, Western Australia